Nogometni klub Celje, commonly referred to as NK Celje or simply Celje, is an association football club from Celje, Slovenia. They play in the Slovenian PrvaLiga. Together with Maribor, they are the only club that have participated in every season of the Slovenian PrvaLiga since its formation in 1991. Celje won their first league title in the 2019–20 season. They have also won the 2004–05 edition of the Slovenian Cup.

History

The club was formed in 1919 as SK Celje. Soon after the World War II, in 1946, the club changed its name to NK Kladivar (expressionistic term in Slovene for a blacksmith). In 1964 they qualified for the Yugoslav Second League, where they played for one year.

In 1992, one year after Slovenia gained independence from Yugoslavia, the club was renamed as Publikum due to sponsorship reasons. They reached the finals of Slovenian Cup in 1993 and 1995, but lost on both occasions, having been beaten by Olimpija and Mura, respectively. In 2003, Celje was in a title race with Maribor until the last two rounds, but in the end finished second and also lost the Slovenian cup final against Olimpija during the same season. Two years later, in 2005, the club reached the final for the fourth time and this time they finally lifted their first trophy, defeating Gorica 1–0 in front of their own fans at the Arena Petrol. Celje were also in the finals the next year, but lost to Koper after the penalty shoot-out. In early 2007 they dropped Publikum from their name.

In 2020, Celje won their first national title after winning the 2019–20 Slovenian PrvaLiga season.

Stadium
For most of its early years, the club played at the Glazija Stadium, but obtained the Skalna Klet after merging with ŽŠD Celje in 1967. Glazija was demolished in 1983 and the club moved permanently to Skalna Klet. Since the stadium was in poor condition and could not meet UEFA stadium regulations, the club officials decided to build a new stadium and in 2003 the main stand of the new Arena Petrol stadium was built. The capacity at the time was 3,600 covered seats. After 2003, three new separate stands were built and when the last one opened in 2008, the stadium was completed. The current capacity of the stadium is 13,059 seats from which around 50% are covered. In July 2017, the stadium was renamed to Stadion Z'dežele.

Current squad

Honours
League
Slovenian First League (since 1991)
Winners: 2019–20
Runners-up (2): 2002–03, 2014–15
Slovenian Republic League (prior 1991)
Winners: 1963–64
Runners-up (6): 1936–37, 1950, 1959–60, 1960–61, 1970–71, 1973–74

Cup
Slovenian Cup (since 1991)
Winners: 2004–05
Runners-up (9): 1992–93, 1994–95, 2002–03, 2005–06, 2011–12, 2012–13, 2014–15, 2015–16, 2020–21
Slovenian Republic Cup (1953–1991)
Winners: 1964
MNZ Celje Cup
Runners-up: 1991–92

Domestic league and cup results

*Best results are highlighted.

European record
All results (home and away) list Celje's goal tally first.

List of managers

 Bojan Prašnikar (1989–1991)
 Stanko Božičevič (1992)
 Janko Benčina (1992)
 Janez Zavrl (1993–1994)
 Ivan Marković (1994)
 Filip Mendaš (1994)
 Borut Jarc (1994–1996)
 Milovan Tarbuk (1996–1997)
 Stanko Poklepović (1997–1998)
 Edin Osmanović (1998–1999)
 Nikola Ilievski (1999–2000)
 Marijan Pušnik (2000–2004)
 Ivica Matković (2004–2005)
 Marko Pocrnjič (2005)
 Nikola Ilievski (2005–2006)
 Janez Žilnik (2006)
 Pavel Pinni (2007–2008)
 Slaviša Stojanovič (2008–2009)
 Milan Đuričić (2009–2010)
 Damijan Romih (2010)
 Stane Bevc (2010–2011)
 Damijan Romih (2011–2012)
 Marijan Pušnik (2012)
 Miloš Rus (2013–2014)
 Simon Rožman (2014–2015)
 Iztok Kapušin (2015–2016)
 Robert Pevnik (2016)
 Igor Jovićević (2016–2017)
 Tomaž Petrovič (2017)
 Dušan Kosič (2017–2020)
 Jiří Jarošík (2020–2021)
 Agron Šalja (2021)
 Simon Sešlar (2021)
 Simon Rožman (2022)
 Roman Pylypchuk (2022–present)

References

External links

Official website 
PrvaLiga profile 
UEFA profile

 
Association football clubs established in 1919
Sport in Celje
Football clubs in Slovenia
Football clubs in Yugoslavia
1919 establishments in Yugoslavia
Unrelegated association football clubs